Nathanael Gottfried Leske (22 October 1751 in Muskau – 25 November 1786 in Marburg) was a German natural scientist and geologist.

After his studies at Bergakademie of Freiberg in Saxony and the Franckeschen Stiftungen in Halle, Leske became a special professor of natural history at the University of Leipzig in 1775.

From 1777 to 1786 he taught economics at this university, and in 1786 he was called to the chair of financial science and economics at the University of Marburg. However, he had a fatal accident on his way to Marburg.

Throughout his life Leske corresponded with his teacher and close friend of Abraham Gottlob Werner, famous geologist and mineralogist at Weimar. He also edited the Leipziger Magazin zur Naturkunde, Mathematik und Oekonomie (1781-1789)  with Christlieb Benedict Funk and Carl Friedrich Hindenburg.

Leske possessed an extensive mineral and natural history collection called the Leskean Cabinet, which was arranged after his death by Dietrich Ludwig Gustav Karsten and later, in 1792, sold to the Dublin Society. The collection included other natural history specimens many from the collections of Johann Friedrich Gmelin and Johan Christian Fabricius. These specimens are now in the National Museum of Ireland.

Works
Ichthyologiae Lipsiensis specimen. Lipsiae: Siegfrief Lebrecht Crusius, 1774.
with Jacob Theodor Klein Additamenta ad Jacob Theodor Klein Naturalem dispositionim echinodermatum et lucubratiunculam de aculeis echinorum marinorum Lipsiae Ex Officina Gleditschiana, 1778. BHL
Anfangsgrunde der Naturgeschichte. Zwote [sic] verbesserte und viel vermehrte Ausgabe. Leipzig: Siegfried Lebrecht Crusius, 1784.
 Reise durch Sachsen in Rüksicht der Naturgeschichte und Ökonomie unternommen und beschrieben. Leipzig: J.G. Müllersche Buchhandlung, 1785
 Museum Leskeanum Leipzig: J.G. Müller, 1789. BHL

References

 Werner Andert und Hans Prescher: Nathanael Gottfried Leske (1751-1786). Zum 225. Geburtstag des ersten Erforschers der Naturkunde und Ökonomie der Oberlausitz und Theoretikers der Landwirtschaft. In: Sächsische Heimatblätter Jg. 23, 1977, S. 73-89 (m. Bild).
 Jan Solta: Die Freundschaft Nathanael Gottfried Leskes mit Johann Christian Schubarts 1780-1786. In: Jan Solta: Wirtschaft, Kultur und Nationalität. Ein Studienband zur sorbischen Geschichte. Bautzen 1990, S. 56-75 = Schriftenreihe des Instituts für sorbische Volksforschung in Bautzen Bd. 58.
Richard I Vane-Wright, 1975. The butterflies named by J.F. Gmelin (Lepidoptera: Rhopalocera). Bulletin of the British Museum (Natural History), Entomology 32: 17–64.

External links
Zoologica Göttingen State and University Library

1751 births
1786 deaths
People from Bad Muskau
18th-century German geologists
German entomologists
People from the Electorate of Saxony
Academic staff of Leipzig University
People from Görlitz (district)
18th-century agronomists
Cameralists